Ponnaluru is a village in Prakasam district of the Indian state of Andhra Pradesh. It is located in Ponnaluru mandal in Kandukur revenue division.

Geography 
It has an average elevation of 42.

References 

Villages in Prakasam district
Mandal headquarters in Prakasam district